Apistogramma is a large genus of freshwater fish in the family Cichlidae found in South America, but also commonly kept in aquariums. They are dwarf cichlids that mostly feed on tiny animals and have breeding behaviors that vary depending on the exact species.

Range, conservation status and habitat
Apistogramma are exclusively found in tropical and subtropical South America in the lowlands east of the Andes. The highest richness is in the western Amazon Basin and Orinoco Basin, but there are also species in the Guianan Shield, eastern Amazon Basin, rivers flowing into the Atlantic in northern Brazil (Tocantins–Araguaia to Parnaíba) and the Río de la Plata Basin. Although a few species are widespread, most members of this genus have small ranges. Few members of the genus have been evaluated by the IUCN, mostly either ranking as least concern (not threatened) or data deficient (limited available data prevents an evaluation), but some of the highly localized Apistogramma species likely are threatened. Primary threats to their survival are deforestation (causing changes in their microhabitat) and pollution (for example by oil drilling or mining).

Apistogramma generally inhabit streams, or edges of rivers or lakes.

Appearance
Most species are strongly sexually dimorphic, with males generally larger than females and possessing different color patterns than the females (which at least when breeding are most frequently yellow with blackish markings); in a few species this pattern is reversed or the sexes are rather similar. Additionally, they often change color depending on behavior, for example when looking for food, breeding or during aggressive encounters. A few species, including A. agassizii, A. cacatuoides, A hongsloi and A. macmasteri, have been selectively bred by aquarists to achieve brighter colors than the natural, wild forms.

Behavior
Apistogramma are omnivores, but tending towards micropredatory. Their main food items consist of aquatic insect larvae and other small invertebrates, fish fry, algae and plant debris.

Brood care is highly developed, as in most cichlids. Nearly all  Apistogramma species spawn in crevices (small caves), typically in holes in sunken logs or branches, or in leaf litter aggregations. A number of breeding strategies exist in the genus. Some species breed in polygamous harems, while other species form monogamous pairs. Three of the described species, A. barlowi, A. megastoma and A. pantalone, practice mouthbrooding, either by both parents or only by the female. In most cases, regardless of the breeding strategy, the female is more highly involved with care of the eggs and fry, whilst the male defends a territory from predators. The sex of the fry is affected by the water conditions: In all species where it has been studied warmer water results in more males and in some species more acidic water (lower pH) also results in more males.

Taxonomy and species

Apistogramma is part of Geophagini and its closest relatives are Apistogrammoides and Taeniacara. There are currently 93 recognized Apistogramma species, making it the most species-rich genus of cichlid in the Americas, together with Crenicichla. New species of Apistogramma are regularly described, and undescribed species—sometimes cryptic—are known to exist in the genus. Several of the recognized species occur in more than one form, and some of these actually may represent separate species, as appears to be the case for the "Papagayo" and "Pebás" forms, both typically included in A. ortegai. A comprehensive taxonomic review of the genus is necessary. The genus is sometimes divided into subgroups based on the appearance and phylogenetic relationship of the various species.

 Apistogramma acrensis Staeck, 2003
 Apistogramma agassizii (Steindachner, 1875) 
 Apistogramma aguarico Römer & Hahn, 2013
 Apistogramma alacrina S. O. Kullander, 2004
 Apistogramma allpahuayo Römer, Beninde, Duponchelle, Vela Díaz, Ortega, Hahn, Soares, Díaz Cachay, García-Dávila, Sirvas-Cornejo & Renno, 2012
 Apistogramma amoena (Cope, 1872)
 Apistogramma angayuara S. O. Kullander & E. F. G. Ferreira, 2005
 Apistogramma arua Römer & Warzel, 1998
 Apistogramma atahualpa Römer, 1997
 Apistogramma baenschi Römer, Hahn, Römer, Soares & Wöhler, 2004
 Apistogramma barlowi Römer & Hahn, 2008
 Apistogramma bitaeniata Pellegrin, 1936
 Apistogramma borellii (Regan, 1906) 
 Apistogramma brevis S. O. Kullander, 1980
 Apistogramma cacatuoides Hoedeman, 1951 
 Apistogramma caetei S. O. Kullander, 1980
 Apistogramma caudomaculata Mesa_Salazar & Lasso, 2011
 Apistogramma cinilabra Römer, Duponchelle, Vela Díaz, García-Dávila, Sirvas-Cornejo, Díaz Cachay & Renno, 2011
 Apistogramma commbrae (Regan, 1906) 
 Apistogramma cruzi S. O. Kullander, 1986
 Apistogramma diplotaenia S. O. Kullander, 1987
 Apistogramma eleutheria Varella & Britzke, 2016 
 Apistogramma elizabethae S. O. Kullander, 1980
 Apistogramma eremnopyge Ready & S. O. Kullander, 2004
 Apistogramma erythrura Staeck & I. Schindler, 2008
 Apistogramma eunotus S. O. Kullander, 1981
 Apistogramma feconat Römer, Soares, García-Dávila, Duponchelle, Renno & Hahn, 2015
 Apistogramma flabellicauda Mesa-Salazar & Lasso, 2011
 Apistogramma flavipedunculata Varella & Britzke, 2016
 Apistogramma geisleri Meinken, 1971
 Apistogramma gephyra S. O. Kullander, 1980
 Apistogramma gibbiceps Meinken, 1969
 Apistogramma gossei S. O. Kullander, 1982
 Apistogramma guttata Antonio C., S. O. Kullander & Lasso A., 1989
 Apistogramma helkeri Schindler & Staeck, 2013
 Apistogramma hippolytae S. O. Kullander, 1982
 Apistogramma hoignei Meinken, 1965
 Apistogramma hongsloi S. O. Kullander, 1979
 Apistogramma huascar Römer, Pretor & Hahn, 2006
 Apistogramma inconspicua S. O. Kullander, 1983
 Apistogramma iniridae S. O. Kullander, 1979
 Apistogramma inornata Staeck, 2003
 Apistogramma intermedia Mesa-Salazar & Lasso, 2011
 Apistogramma juruensis S. O. Kullander, 1986
 Apistogramma kullanderi Varella & Sabaj Pérez, 2014
 Apistogramma lineata Mesa-Salazar & Lasso, 2011
 Apistogramma linkei Koslowski, 1985
 Apistogramma luelingi S. O. Kullander, 1976
 Apistogramma macmasteri S. O. Kullander, 1979
 Apistogramma martini Römer, Hahn, Römer, Soares & Wöhler, 2003
 Apistogramma megaptera Mesa Salazar & Lasso, 2011
 Apistogramma megastoma Römer, Römer, Estivals, Vela DíazGarcía-Dávila, Duponchelle, Hahn & Renno, 2017
 Apistogramma meinkeni S. O. Kullander, 1980
 Apistogramma mendezi U. Römer, 1994
 Apistogramma minima Mesa S. & Lasso A., 2011
 Apistogramma moae S. O. Kullander, 1980
 Apistogramma nijsseni S. O. Kullander, 1979
 Apistogramma norberti Staeck, 1991
 Apistogramma nororientalis Mesa-Salazar & Lasso, 2011
 Apistogramma ortegai Britzke, C. de Oliveira & S. O. Kullander, 2014
 Apistogramma ortmanni (C. H. Eigenmann, 1912)
 Apistogramma panduro U. Römer, 1997
 Apistogramma pantalone Römer, Römer, Soares & Hahn, 2006
 Apistogramma paucisquamis S. O. Kullander & Staeck, 1988
 Apistogramma paulmuelleri Römer, Beninde, Duponchelle, García-Dávila, Vela Díaz & Renno, 2013
 Apistogramma payaminonis S. O. Kullander, 1986
 Apistogramma pedunculata Mesa-Salazar & Lasso, 2011
 Apistogramma personata S. O. Kullander, 1980
 Apistogramma pertensis (Haseman, 1911)
 Apistogramma piaroa Mesa-Salazar & Lasso, 2011
 Apistogramma piauiensis S. O. Kullander, 1980
 Apistogramma playayacu Römer, Beninde & Hahn, 2011
 Apistogramma pleurotaenia (Regan, 1909)
 Apistogramma psammophila Staeck & Schindler, 2019
 Apistogramma pulchra S. O. Kullander, 1980
 Apistogramma regani S. O. Kullander, 1980
 Apistogramma resticulosa S. O. Kullander, 1980
 Apistogramma rositae Römer, Römer & Hahn, 2006
 Apistogramma rubrolineata Hein, Zarske & Zapata, 2002
 Apistogramma rupununi Fowler, 1914
 Apistogramma salpinction S. O. Kullander & E. F. G. Ferreira, 2005
 Apistogramma similis Staeck, 2003
 Apistogramma sororcula  Staeck & Schindler, 2016
 Apistogramma staecki Koslowski, 1985
 Apistogramma steindachneri (Regan, 1908)
 Apistogramma taeniata (Günther, 1862)
 Apistogramma trifasciata (C. H. Eigenmann & C. H. Kennedy, 1903)
 Apistogramma tucurui Staeck, 2003
 Apistogramma uaupesi S. O. Kullander, 1980
 Apistogramma urteagai S. O. Kullander, 1986
 Apistogramma velifera Staeck, 2003
 Apistogramma viejita S. O. Kullander, 1979
 Apistogramma wapisana U. Römer, Hahn & Conrad, 2006
 Apistogramma wolli Römer, Soares, García-Dávila, Duponchelle, Renno & Hahn, 2015

References

 
Geophagini
Fish of South America
Freshwater fish genera
Taxa named by Charles Tate Regan